Grzybiny  is a village in the administrative district of Gmina Działdowo, within Działdowo County, Warmian-Masurian Voivodeship, in northern Poland.

The village has a population of 427.

References

Grzybiny